Two is the second studio album by Australian recording artist Lenka. It was released on 19 April 2011 in the United States through Epic Records and on 28 February 2011 in Singapore.

The album was Lenka's second solo album after having been a member of the group Decoder Ring. The first single from the album, "Heart Skips a Beat", was released on 11 February 2011 to little commercial success. Because of this lack of success, Two failed to chart as well as its predecessor, Lenka (2008).

Singles
"Heart Skips a Beat" was the first official single. and was released on the 11 February 2011, to little success. A music video was released on 17 March 2011 through Vevo. However, the song was well received by critics.

The album's title track, "Two", was the second single. Its music video was premiered on 30 June 2011 on YouTube. Like its predecessor, "Two" failed to achieve any commercial success.

"Everything at Once" was initially released as the second promotional single from the album through iTunes. Lenka performed the song on Jimmy Kimmel Live! along with "Heart Skips a Beat". The song was used in a TV advertisement for Windows 8 in 2012, leading to its release as the third official single on 4 November 2012. The single was a commercial success and became Lenka's second most successful single after "The Show".

Promotional singles
"Roll with the Punches" was the first promotional single released from the album, on 8 November 2010.

Critical reception

Two was well received by most critics, earning 4 stars out of 5 from AllMusic. AbsolutePunk also gave the album a positive review with a grade of 68%, stating, "...if you're looking for harmless hooks and melodies that are recycled, yet playful, Lenka certainly has you covered."

Track listing

Personnel
Adapted from AllMusic

 Lenka – vocals, autoharp, Fender Rhodes, keyboards, Mellotron, organ, percussion, piano, synthesizer
 Ben H. Allen – mixing, piano, production 
 Ian Archer – guitar
 Guy Aroch – photography
 Adam Ayan – mastering
 Sigurdur Birkis – drums
 Lukas Burton – A&R
 Jason Cooper – drums
 Danny T. Levin – horn
 Samuel Dixon – bass guitar
 Mike DuClos – bass
 Chris Elms – engineer, guitar, mixing, programming
 Rob Gardner – engineer
 James Gulliver Hancock – artwork, design
 Robby Handley – bass guitar
 Joe Hegleman – management
 Danny Kalb – mixing
 Erik Kertes – bass guitar
 David Kosten – engineer, keyboards, mixing, percussion, production , programming
 Sunny Levine – drums, engineer, production , programming
 Dougal Lott – engineer
 Andy Page – engineer, guitar, mixing, programming
 Eamon Ryland – guitar, Mellotron, pedal steel
 Kevin Salem – additional production , bass, engineer, guitar, mixing
 Ron Shapiro – management
 Guy Sigsworth – keyboards, production , strings
 Eg White – drums, engineer, guitar, keyboards, producer
 David Wrench – engineer
 Amir Yaghmai – guitar, violin

Charts

Release history

References

2011 albums
Lenka albums
Epic Records albums